Practical Demonkeeping is a novel by American writer Christopher Moore, published in 1992. His first novel, it deals with a demon from Hell and his master.  The novel has been translated and published in German, Italian, Japanese, Spanish, Portuguese and Russian.

Plot summary

Travis was born in 1900, yet he has not aged since 1919, because he accidentally called up a demon from hell named Catch as his servant, presumably forever. Ever since then, Travis has been trying to get rid of Catch, but he is unable to do so because he has lost the repository of the necessary incantations. He traces their whereabouts to a fictional town called Pine Cove, along Big Sur coast, where he thinks the woman he gave them to may be residing. Interactions with the townspeople and with a djinn, who is pursuing Catch, create considerable complications.

Several characters from this novel continue their lives in later novels by Moore. Catch appears in a later book (Lamb), but a much earlier period of history; in addition, the setting of Pine Cove itself is revisited for The Lust Lizard of Melancholy Cove and The Stupidest Angel. The fictional town of Pine Cove is described as being within easy driving distance of San Luis Obispo, California.

External links
Book Homepage
Christopher Moore.com

1992 fantasy novels
1992 American novels
Absurdist fiction
Novels by Christopher Moore
Novels set in California
Cambria, California
Mass media in San Luis Obispo County, California
Demon novels
1992 debut novels